is a former Japanese football player and manager.

Playing career
Satsukawa was born in Shizuoka Prefecture on April 18, 1972. After graduating from Shimizu Commercial High School, he joined All Nippon Airways (later Yokohama Flügels) in 1991. He played many matches as mainly center back from first season. The club won the champions 1993 Emperor's Cup their first major title. In Asia, the club also won the champions 1994–95 Asian Cup Winners' Cup their first Asian title. However the club was disbanded end of 1998 season due to financial strain. At last tournament 1998 Emperor's Cup which the club won the champions, although he played all 4 matches until semifinal, he could not play in the Final for suspension. In 1999, he moved to Kashiwa Reysol. He played left back of three backs defense with Hong Myung-bo and Takeshi Watanabe until 2001. The club on the champions 1999 J.League Cup and the 3rd place in 1999 and 2000 J1 League. After that, although the results of the club were sluggish, he played as regular player as center back for a long time. In October 2003, he broke his right leg and he could not play in the match for 10 months. Although he came back in August 2004, the club finished at bottom place in 2004 season. End of 2005 season, the club was relegated to J2 League and he retired.

Coaching career
After retirement, Satsukawa started coaching career at Kashiwa Reysol in 2007. In 2008, he moved to Regional Leagues club AC Nagano Parceiro and became a coach. He became a manager in 2010 and the club was promoted to Japan Football League (JFL) end of 2010 season. In 2011 and 2012 season, the club won the 2nd place in JFL. In 2013, he moved to JFL club FC Ryukyu. The club was promoted to new league J3 League from 2014 season. In 2016, he moved to J3 club SC Sagamihara. However he resigned as manager in August. In 2017, he signed with JFL club Nara Club. He managed the club in 2 seasons and resigned end of 2018 season. In 2019, he moved to Regional Leagues club Banditonce Kakogawa.

Club statistics

Managerial statistics

References

External links
 
 
 

1972 births
Living people
Association football people from Shizuoka Prefecture
Japanese footballers
Japan Soccer League players
J1 League players
Yokohama Flügels players
Kashiwa Reysol players
Japanese football managers
J3 League managers
AC Nagano Parceiro managers
FC Ryukyu managers
SC Sagamihara managers
Nara Club managers
Association football defenders